Larry Doby Johnson (August 17, 1950 – May 26, 2013) was an American professional baseball player. A catcher, he appeared in 12 games over five  Major League seasons for the Cleveland Indians (1972; 1974), Montreal Expos (1975–76), and Chicago White Sox (1978). Johnson was born in Cleveland, Ohio. He attended Cleveland State University and Manatee Junior College.

Johnson was named for Larry Doby, the first African-American to play in the American League, a seven-time All-Star outfielder, and member of the Baseball Hall of Fame. Doby was a star for the hometown Cleveland Indians the year of Johnson's birth.

Johnson was selected by the Indians in the ninth round of the 1968 Major League Baseball draft. Although he had a 14-year career in minor league baseball and hit an even 100 career minor league home runs, his longest stint as a major league player was six games for the 1976 Expos. His five MLB hits in 29 plate appearances included two doubles. He drew two bases on balls and was credited with one sacrifice.

However, Johnson and his namesake, Doby, were teammates (with Doby serving as a coach) on three separate MLB clubs during the 1970s: the 1974 Indians, 1976 Expos and 1978 White Sox. Johnson's last game as a major leaguer, on May 25, 1978, preceded by five weeks Doby's July 1 appointment as manager of the White Sox.

Larry Johnson died suddenly on May 26, 2013. His son, Josh, also played professional baseball and is a member of the San Diego Padres'  coaching staff.

References

External links

1950 births
2013 deaths
African-American baseball players
American expatriate baseball players in Canada
Baseball players from Cleveland
Chicago White Sox players
Cleveland Indians players
Denver Bears players
Elmira Pioneers players
Evansville Triplets players
Gulf Coast Indians players
Iowa Oaks players
Jacksonville Suns players
Major League Baseball catchers
Memphis Blues players
Miami Amigos players
Montreal Expos players
Oklahoma City 89ers players
Reno Silver Sox players
Rochester Red Wings players
San Antonio Brewers players
Baseball players from Tampa, Florida
Statesville/Monroe Indians players
Waterbury Indians players
20th-century African-American sportspeople
21st-century African-American people